Shimpstown is an unincorporated community in Montgomery Township in Franklin County, Pennsylvania, United States. Shimpstown is located on Pennsylvania Route 75, south of Mercersburg.

References

Unincorporated communities in Franklin County, Pennsylvania
Unincorporated communities in Pennsylvania